Hong Leong Company (Malaysia) Berhad, more commonly known as Hong Leong Group, is a conglomerate based in Malaysia. Founded as a trading company in 1963 by Quek Leng Chan and Kwek Hong Png, the company controls 14 listed companies involved in the financial services, manufacturing, distribution, property and infrastructure development. The group's shares are listed on stock exchanges of Malaysia, Singapore, Hong Kong, Manila and Europe.

Hong Leong Group

Banking
Hong Leong Financial Group is the holding company for Hong Leong Group's banking and financial services.

 Hong Leong Bank
 Hong Leong Capital
 Hong Leong Assurance

Manufacturing
 Hong Leong Industries Berhad
 Malaysian Pacific Industries Berhad
 Southern Steel Berhad
 Hume Industries Berhad

Property development
 Guoco Group
 Guoco Leisure Ltd - the holding company (listed on Singapore Exchange) of an international hospitality and leisure group, operating through a subsidiary GLH Hotels Limited headquartered in London, UK.

See also
Dao Heng Bank
Overseas Trust Bank
DBS Bank (Hong Kong)

References

External links

1963 establishments in Malaysia
Companies listed on Bursa Malaysia
Financial services companies established in 1963
Conglomerate companies of Malaysia
Malaysian companies established in 1963